Anatoly Anatolyevich Seryshev (born 19 July 1965) is a Russian politician. He is currently the Plenipotentiary Representative to the Siberian Federal District, incumbent since 12 October 2021.

Biography
In 1988, he graduated from the Irkutsk Institute of National Economy with a degree in economics. In 1990, he graduated from the Higher Courses of the KGB of the Soviet Union with a degree in officer with higher specialized education. From 1988 to 2016 he served in the security agencies.

Seryshev later held the position of Head of the Directorate of the Federal Security Service in the Republic of Karelia from 2011 to 2016, and the deputy director of the Federal Customs Service from 2016 to 2018. On 13 June 2018 he was appointed .

On 12 October 2021, Seryshev was appointed as the 6th Plenipotentiary Representative in the Siberian Federal District.

Income
According to the data posted in the declaration containing information on income, expenses, property and property obligations of persons holding government positions in Russia, in 2018, Seryshev earned 7,790,316 rubles. The income of his wife for the same period amounted to 3,198,924 rubles.

U.S. sanctions target 

References

1965 births
Living people
21st-century Russian politicians
People from Irkutsk Oblast
Russian individuals subject to the U.S. Department of the Treasury sanctions